KDMO (1490 AM) is an American radio station broadcasting a nostalgia format; during the holidays the station plays Christmas music.  It is licensed to Carthage, Missouri, and serves the greater Joplin, Missouri, area.  The station is owned by Carthage Broadcasting Company, Inc., and features programming from CNN Radio.

Unusual among AM stations, KDMO has been broadcasting music continuously since 1947.  For most of its 70-plus year history the station aired Easy Listening music, Country, or a mixture of both.  The station's motto is, "Too cool for FM."

References

External links

DMO
Nostalgia radio in the United States
Adult standards radio stations in the United States